The Catholic High School Athletic Association or CHSAA is a high school athletic association made up of Catholic high schools based in New York City, Long Island, Westchester and Buffalo. It is the largest Catholic high school athletic league in the United States.

Members
The NYCHSAA is divided into four sections.

New York Section
The New York Section consists of schools in Westchester, the Bronx, Manhattan, and Staten Island, corresponding to the Archdiocese of New York.

Brooklyn-Queens Section
The Brooklyn-Queens Section consists of schools in Brooklyn and Queens, corresponding to the Diocese of Brooklyn.

Nassau-Suffolk Section
The Nassau-Suffolk Section consists of schools in Nassau and Suffolk counties, corresponding to the Diocese of Rockville Centre.

Buffalo Section

The Buffalo Section consists of schools in Buffalo area corresponding to the Diocese of Buffalo, and is also referred to as the Monsignor Martin Athletic Association. Unlike the other sections, membership is open to non-Catholic schools.

Rest of the state
Catholic schools outside the CHSAA's territory compete in their local sections of the New York State Public High School Athletic Association. This includes Hudson Valley schools beyond Westchester County (although those are within the Archdiocese), as well as the state's other four dioceses (Albany, Ogdensburg, Rochester, and Syracuse).

Former members

History
New York's Catholic High School Athletic Association (CHSAA) was formed in March 1927. The Catholic schools in the city from approximately 1908 to 1922 competed along with their grammar school counterparts in baseball and track, but no larger organization arose from the competition. The Catholic secondary schools of the city remained largely unorganized, while their counterparts in such cities as Chicago and Philadelphia had been organized into leagues for years. Finally, in 1927, the Southern Branch of the New York Catholic High Schools’ Athletic Association organized league competition with an outdoor track meet held at Fordham University on May 26, 1927. The charter members of the league were Fordham Prep, All Hallows, LaSalle Academy, Regis, St. Ann's, and Xavier High, all in Manhattan; and Brooklyn Prep, Bishop Loughlin, Brooklyn Cathedral, St. John's Prep, and St. Francis Prep; all in Brooklyn.

In 1928, the CHSAA introduced indoor track, basketball, and baseball to the program, and in 1929 added cross country and ice hockey. In 1930, swimming was added to the program. The basketball winner would compete with the three other sectional winners in the state for the right to compete in the Loyola National Catholic Basketball tournament in Chicago. A.G. Spalding & Co. contributed two silver loving cups for the baseball and football competition. The first team winning the league title in baseball or football three times would receive permanent possession of the cup.

See also
New York state high school boys basketball championships
List of New York state high school league conferences

References

External links
  League Website
  Brooklyn Eagle Sports

New York (state) sports-related lists
High school sports associations in New York (state)
High school sports conferences and leagues in the United States
 
New York (state) education-related lists
Catholic sports organizations